is a Japanese garden located near the Kanda River in  Bunkyō, Tokyo. The garden underwent renovation work and along with this there was a request for submission of a new name for the garden.

Formerly the second home of Hosokawa, the head of Kumamoto Domain at the end of the Edo period, the premises later became the main residence of the Hosokawa family. The park features a circular hill-and-pond garden that makes clever use of changes in elevation and emphasizes the garden's natural scenery. There are natural springs, stone lanterns, bamboo fences; the pond contains carps. The entrance building Shoseikaku, which was constructed in the Taisho era, was a studying place of the Hosokawa family. 

The garden can be accessed by walking from Waseda Station or Edogawabashi Station. 
Regular hours are from 9:00 to 17:00. Admission is free.

A gate between the Shin-Edogawa park and the Eisei Bunko Museum is opened from 10:00 to 16:00. Migration in two of facilities becomes possible this time.

Gallery

External links

 Bunkyo City Information
 Shin-Edogawa Garden in "Waseda Weekly"

Bunkyō
Gardens in Tokyo
Higo-Hosokawa clan